Patha Majeru is a village in Challapalli Mandal in Krishna District, Andhra Pradesh, India.	

Patha Majeru's assigned post office is in Lakshmipuram (Krishna).

References
Villages in Krishna district